Hercules is a Disney media franchise comprising a film series and additional merchandise, starting with the 1997 animated Disney feature of the same name, directed by Ron Clements and John Musker.

Films

Hercules
Hercules is a 1997 American animated musical comedy-fantasy film produced by Walt Disney Animation Studios and released by Walt Disney Pictures. The 35th Disney animated feature film, the film was directed by Ron Clements and John Musker. The film is based on the legendary Greek mythology hero Heracles (known in the film by his Roman name, Hercules), the son of Zeus, in Greek mythology.

Hercules: Zero to Hero
Hercules: Zero to Hero is a 1999 direct-to-video followup to Disney's 1997 animated feature Hercules. It was released on August 31, 1999, and serves as the pilot to Hercules: The Animated Series. It packages four episodes of the television series to make a single narrative.

Live-action remake
In April, 2020, it was reported that a live-action remake of Hercules was being developed by Walt Disney Pictures, with Jeffery Silver and Karen Gilchrist, who previously produced the CGI remake of The Lion King, set to produce the film. Joe and Anthony Russo will also serve as producers on the film, while David Callaham will write the script. In June 2022, it was announced that Guy Ritchie, who previously directed Disney's  live-action Aladdin remake, had signed on to direct the film. Joe Russo said the reimagining movie will pay homage to the original with a more modern spin on it and that it will also be a modern musical inspired by TikTok.

Television

Disney's Hercules: The Animated Series
Disney's Hercules: The Animated Series is an American animated series based on the 1997 film of the same name and the Greek myth. The series premiered in syndication on August 31, 1998, and on Disney's One Saturday Morning on September 12, 1998. The syndicated series ran 52 episodes, while the Saturday morning run ran 13.

"Hercules and the Arabian Night"
"Hercules and the Arabian Night" is a crossover episode of Disney's Hercules: The Animated Series featuring characters from Aladdin.

Disney's House of Mouse
Disney's House of Mouse is an animated television series, produced by Walt Disney Television which originally aired from 2001 to 2003.

Once Upon a Time
Hades appeared in the latter half of Once Upon a Time's fifth season episode starting with "Souls of the Departed" portrayed by Greg Germann. In the episode "Labor of Love" Hercules and Megara were both portrayed by Jonathan Whitesell and Kacey Rohl.

Video game

Disney's Hercules: Action Game
Disney's Hercules: Action Game is a video game for the PlayStation and PC released on June 20, 1997 by Disney Interactive. It was made in one week before the animated movie released in the same year.

Disney's Animated Storybook: Hercules
Disney's Animated Storybook: Hercules is part of the Disney's Animated Storybook series.

Disney's Hercules Print Studio
Disney's Hercules Print Studio is part of the Disney's Print Studio series.

Hades Challenge
Hades Challenge is a PC video game released on April 17, 1998. It is a first–person adventure/puzzle game and a spinoff to Hercules in which the player assumes the role of a rookie hero undergoing various adventures based upon elements of Greek mythology not directly explored in the main film while being recurrently antagonized by Hades and Pain and Panic.

Kingdom Hearts
The characters of the film appear in the Kingdom Hearts video game series in the recurring in-game world of "Olympus Coliseum". It is the most represented Disney franchise appearing in nearly every entry in the series bar Kingdom Hearts: Dream Drop Distance. Unlike other Disney worlds which closely follows the plot of [their] original film, the stories are original and feature original plots in each game and setting. It is also the only franchise where the characters interact with guest characters appearing in Square-Enix's Final Fantasy series.

In the first Kingdom Hearts, Olympus Coliseum appears as an arena mini-game world where Sora, Donald and Goofy can face off against various enemies encountered during the story, and features Hercules, Phil, Hades, Cerberus, Rock Titan, and Ice Titan. In Kingdom Hearts II, the Underworld can be explored and includes new characters like Megara, Pain and Panic, Pegasus, and Hydra.

In Kingdom Hearts III, a new world "Olympus" appears as the opening world the heroes' embark in. The Coliseum is absent, but the City of Thebes, Mount Olympus and the Realm of the Gods can be explored, and characters featured include Zeus and his fellow gods, the Lava Titan and Wind Titan.

The world also appears in Kingdom Hearts: Chain of Memories, Kingdom Hearts coded, Kingdom Hearts 358/2 Days, and Kingdom Hearts Birth by Sleep.

Disney Magic Kingdoms
In the world builder video game Disney Magic Kingdoms, a limited time Event based on Hercules introduced Hercules, Philoctetes, Meg, Pegasus, Hades, Pain and Panic as playable characters, as well as some attractions based on locations of the film. Shenzi, Banzai and Ed were also included as playable characters in a later update of the game. In the game the characters are involved in new storylines that serve as a continuation of the film.

Cast and characters

Stage musical

Hercules: The Muse-ical
Hercules: The Muse-ical (also known as Hercules: A Muse-ical Comedy) is a show on Disney Cruise Line's Disney Wonder ship. It is a "Vaudevillian salute" to the 1997 Disney film, and features some of its songs. "It had its final performance in 2008 to make way for Toy Story: The Musical."

Rotoscopers explains: "Not taking itself seriously for a moment, Hercules‘ sea voyage was practically half musical, half stand-up comedy. Hades, Pain, and Panic (the latter two both portrayed by women) especially packed a humorous punch, infusing relevant pop-culture references into the script. They often changed to keep up with current trends, much like Genie's jokes in Aladdin: A Musical Spectacular, a former show at Disney California Adventure."

Hercules (musical)
On February 6, 2019, it was announced that a theatrical adaptation of the film would premiere at the Delacorte Theater in Central Park as part of its annual Shakespeare in the Park festival from August 31 until September 8. Menken and Zippel will return to compose and write the songs, while Kristoffer Diaz will write the book, Lear deBessonet will direct and Chase Brock will choreograph. The cast will include Jelani Alladin (Hercules), Roger Bart (Hades), Jeff Hiller (Panic), James Monroe Iglehart (Phil), Ramona Keller (Thalia), Tamika Lawrence (Calliope), Krysta Rodriguez (Meg), and Rema Webb (Terpsichore).

Music

Hercules: An Original Walt Disney Records Soundtrack
Hercules: An Original Walt Disney Records Soundtrack is the soundtrack for Hercules. It consists of music written by composer Alan Menken and lyricist David Zippel, orchestrated by Danny Troob and Michael Starobin, with vocals performed by Lillias White, LaChanze, Roz Ryan, Roger Bart, Danny DeVito, and Susan Egan among others.

 "The Gospel Truth"
 "Go the Distance"
 "One Last Hope"
 "Zero to Hero"
 "I Won't Say (I'm in Love)"
 "A Star Is Born"

References

 
Walt Disney Studios (division) franchises